Goeppertia makoyana (syn. Calathea makoyana), also known as peacock plant or cathedral windows, is a species of plant belonging to the genus Goeppertia in the family Marantaceae, native to Espírito Santo state of eastern Brazil. It has gained the Royal Horticultural Society's Award of Garden Merit.

Description
The upper surfaces of the leaves are marked with dark green blotches along the veins, and the lower surfaces coloured deep purple, with leaf shafts that are very thin. When new leaves grow they are rolled up and display their pinkish-red undersides. Like others in the genus, it has a horizontal soil stem, rhizome, from which the plants grow up and the roots develop.

Like other "prayer plants",  this plant also raises and closes its leaves at night and opens them up again as dawn breaks.

Gallery

See also
Goeppertia roseopicta, a similar looking plant

References

makoyana
Endemic flora of Brazil
Flora of Espírito Santo
House plants
Garden plants
Plants described in 1872